Homadaula calamitosa is a moth in the family Galacticidae. It was described by Edward Meyrick in 1930. It is found in Sudan.

The wingspan is 14–15 mm. The forewings are grey, irrorated (sprinkled) with white and strewn with numerous irregular dark grey or blackish small spots or dots forming longitudinal series. The plical stigma forms a larger blackish dot and there is some irregular white suffusion beyond this beneath the middle of the disc. The hindwings are whitish grey with dark grey veins.

The larvae feed on the flowers of Acacia arabica and Acacia nilotica.

References

Moths described in 1930
Galacticidae